The Municipal District of Bonnyville No. 87 is a municipal district (MD) in northeastern Alberta, Canada in Division No. 12. On the east, it is adjacent to the province of Saskatchewan.

The district was incorporated on January 1, 1955, through the merger of the Municipal District of Bonnyville No. 87, the Municipal District of Glendon No. 88 and part of Improvement District No. 101.

On May 1, 2021, the municipal district annexed the adjacent Improvement District No. 349.

Geography

Communities and localities 
The following urban municipalities are surrounded by the MD of Bonnyville No. 87.
Cities
Cold Lake
Towns
Bonnyville
Villages
Glendon
Summer villages
Bonnyville Beach
Pelican Narrows

The following hamlets are within the MD of Bonnyville No. 87.
Hamlets
Ardmore
Beaver Crossing
Beaverdam
Cherry Grove
Fort Kent
Iron River
La Corey
Therien

The following Métis settlements and Indian reserves are within the MD of Bonnyville No. 87.

Métis settlements
Elizabeth Metis Settlement
Fishing Lake Metis Settlement

Indian reserves
Cold Lake 149

The following localities are within the MD of Bonnyville No. 87.
Localities

Anshaw
Bank Bay
Beacon Corner
Beaver River
Big Meadow
Birch Grove Estates
Bordenave
Cherry Ridge Estates
Columbine
Dirleton
Durlingville
Elizabeth
Ethel Lake
Flat Lake
Fontaine Subdivision
Franchere
Fresnoy
Goodridge
Gurneyville

Happy Hollow
Holyoke
Hoselaw
Lessard
Marie Lake
Model Development
Moose Lake Estates
Muriel Lake
Nicholson Subdivision
Northshore Heights
Rat Lake
Rife
Smith Lake
Sputinow
Sunset Beach
Sunset View Beach
Truman
Turcotte Division
Vezeau Beach

Demographics 

As a census subdivision in the 2016 Census of Population conducted by Statistics Canada, the MD of Bonnyville No. 87 originally had a population of 13,575 living in 4,820 of its 5,667 total private dwellings, a  change from its 2011 population of 11,191. This included the population of two Metis settlements, Elizabeth (653) and Fishing Lake (446), located within the census subdivision that are municipalities independent of the MD of Bonnyville No. 87. Statistics Canada subsequently amended the 2016 census results for Bonnyville No. 87 to a population of 12,760 living in 4,589 of its 5,405 total dwellings, a  change from its 2011 population of 11,191.

The population of the MD of Bonnyville No. 87 according to its 2014 municipal census is 11,836, a  change from its 2011 population of 10,101.

Visible minorities and Aboriginals 
The following is a breakdown of the visible minority and Aboriginal populations of the Bonnyville No. 87 census subdivision that includes the Elizabeth and Fishing Lake Metis settlements.

See also 
CFB Cold Lake 
List of communities in Alberta
List of municipal districts in Alberta

References

External links 

 
Bonnyville